Cope's brown treefrog or fringe-limbed treefrog (Ecnomiohyla miliaria) is a species of frog in the family Hylidae.
It is found in Costa Rica, Nicaragua, and Panama.
Its natural habitats are subtropical or tropical moist lowland forests and subtropical or tropical moist montane forests.
It is threatened by habitat loss.

References

Ecnomiohyla
Amphibians described in 1886
Taxonomy articles created by Polbot